Dravecky is a surname. Notable people with name include:

Dave Dravecky (born 1956), American baseball player
Jozef Dravecký (1947–2023), Slovak mathematician and diplomat
Vladimír Dravecký (born 1985), Slovak ice hockey player